Franz Vorraber (born August 24, 1962 in Graz, Austria) is an Austrian–German pianist and composer.

Studies 
The son of an organist, Franz Vorraber started practising the piano at the age of 5, followed by first studies on the church organ at the age of 7. The professional studies began in 1972 at the age of 10 with the admission to the piano class for exceptional students at the "University of Music and Performing Arts" in Graz (Austria) with the violin as a second instrument. Later he continued his studies at the "Frankfurt University of Music and Performing Arts" in Germany as a student of Prof. Joachim Volkmann. Both institutions graduated him with honours and highest degrees.

Debut 
Franz Vorraber performed his debut recital in Tokyo, at the age of 19. Since then he has given recitals in Europe, Japan, and the United States and concerts with orchestras such as the Gewandhauskammerorchester Leipzig, the Leipziger Kammerorchester, the Orchestre Philharmonique du Luxembourg, the Westdeutsche Sinfonia, the Staatsphilharmonie Rheinland Pfalz, and the Robert Schumann Philharmonie with conductors such as Dennis Russell Davies, Alun Francis, Dirk Joeres, Daniel Klajner, Hilary Griffiths, Marcus Bosch, Vladislav Czarnecki, Reinhard Seifried, Marcello Bufalini, and Jonathan Seers.

Projects 
One of Vorraber's greatest project was the cyclical performance and first digital recording of Robert Schumann's complete piano works, performed and recorded during twelve evenings in different cities in Europe and Japan. The recordings are released on a series of thirteen CDs  for which he was awarded the Austrian Broadcasting's Pasticcio prize in 2006. As an effect of this Franz Vorraber was acclaimed as one of the most important interpreters of Schumann in our times.

During his career Franz Vorraber received many prizes, for example from the Ministry of Education, from the piano manufacturer Bösendorfer in Vienna and from the city of Graz. He also won the "Joachim Erhard Prize" and received the Best Disk Award in Japan 2001 for the DVD AUDIO "Wiener Abend".

Composition 
In addition to his activities as a musician, Franz Vorraber also devotes himself to composition. Several solo compositions are already published on CD. His first piano concerto was premiered with great success at the monastery festival in Maulbronn, Germany. His wind quintet was premiered by the "Wind Quintet of Staatskapelle Berlin", a seven-piece trio at the Mendelssohnfest, the Nonet in Gewandhaus Leipzig, and his sextet at the Stelzenfestival. A great success was also the project "Sätze von Liebe" (Sentences of Love) with poems and self-compositions together with the writer Peter Härtling.

Lecturer 
Since 1991 Franz Vorraber has been working as a lecturer for piano at the Academy of Music in Wiesbaden, Germany.

Franz Vorraber currently lives in Zellingen, Germany.

Selected discography 
2002-2004: Robert Schumann: The Complete Piano Works, Vol. 1-13 - Label: Thorofon
2003: Camille Saint-Saëns, piano concerto n°2, Franz Vorraber, piano, Anhaltische Philarmonie Dessau, dir.Golo Berg. CD Thoroffon (Bella Musica)
20032007: Intime Träumerey - Franz Vorraber (Piano) & Peter Härtling (Narrator) - Label: K&K Verlagsanstalt
2008: Grand Piano Masters ~ Impromptu - Works by Franz Schubert - Label: K&K Verlagsanstalt
2011: Hommage à Schumann - Works by Franz Schubert, Robert Schumann, Johannes Brahms & Franz Vorraber - Label: Thorofon
2013: Sätze von Liebe (Sentences of Love) - Franz Vorraber (Piano & Compositions) & Peter Härtling (narrator) - Label: K&K Verlagsanstalt

References 

1962 births
21st-century classical composers
21st-century classical pianists
21st-century German composers
21st-century German male classical pianists
21st-century German male musicians
Austrian classical composers
Austrian classical pianists
Living people
Composers from Graz
German classical composers
German classical pianists
German contemporary classical composers
German male classical composers
Male classical pianists